Government Higher Secondary School Panamattom is a school located at Panamattom, Kerala, India accepting students from L.K.G. (Kindergarten) to 12th standard/grade.

History
The school was founded on 25 May 1915, originally as a lower primary school with the name Bharathy Vilasam L.P. School. In 1945 it became a government school. In 1965 it expanded into an upper primary school, then in 1980 into a high school, and in 1997 into a higher secondary school.

The school received a mark of 90% in S.S.L.C tests for 1983. For the 2008–2009 school year, it received the 100% mark of distinction. The school has won the Best School in Kottayam District trophy for many consecutive years, and usually wins the Government Schools section award at the local Youth festival.

Schools in Kottayam district
Educational institutions established in 1915
1915 establishments in India
High schools and secondary schools in Kerala